The Jardin botanique de la Ville de Paris (83 hectares in total) is a collection of four botanical gardens maintained by the city of Paris, France.

 In the Bois de Boulogne
 Jardin des Serres d'Auteuil
 Parc de Bagatelle
 In the Bois de Vincennes
 Arboretum de l'École du Breuil
 Parc floral de Paris

See also 
 List of botanical gardens in France

References 
 Jardin botanique de la Ville de Paris
 French Wikipedia article :fr:Jardin botanique de la Ville de Paris

Gardens in Paris
Botanical gardens in France